Justin Tyler "J. T." Hassell (born August 14, 1995) is an American gridiron football defensive back for the Toronto Argonauts of the Canadian Football League (CFL). Hassell played college football at Florida Tech. He has also been a member of the Cleveland Browns, New England Patriots and New York Jets.

Early life and high school
Hassell was born with only two fingers on his left hand due to a deformity. He grew up in Titusville, Florida and attended Titusville High School before transferring to Astronaut High School.

College career
Hassell began his collegiate career at South Dakota State. He started all 14 of the Jackrabbits games at linebacker as a true freshman and recorded 41 tackles, four tackles for loss, a sack and an interception. Hassell played in 12 games as a sophomore with 21 tackles. Following the end of the season, he decided to transfer to the Division II Florida Institute of Technology in order to be closer to his family.

After sitting out a year due NCAA transfer rules, Hassell led the Panthers and finished fifth in the Gulf South Conference (GSC) with 78 tackles and was named second-team all-conference as a redshirt junior. As a redshirt senior, he made 124 tackles, 9.5 tackles for loss, 4.5 sacks for 34 yards and three forced fumbles and was named first-team All-GSC and the conference Defensive Player of the Year, as well as a first-team All-American by the American Football Coaches Association and the D2CCA, and a second-team All-American by the Associated Press.

Professional career

Cleveland Browns
Hassell signed with the Cleveland Browns as an undrafted free agent on May 3, 2019. He was waived at the end of final roster cuts, but was re-signed to the Browns' practice squad on September 1, 2019. Hassell was promoted to the Browns' active roster on November 20, 2019. He made his NFL debut on November 24, 2019 against the Miami Dolphins, playing nine snaps on special teams and making two tackles in a 41-24 win while also becoming the first Florida Tech player to appear in an NFL regular season game. In his rookie season Hassell played in four games with seven tackles.

Hassell was waived by the Browns on September 3, 2020.

New England Patriots
On November 30, 2020, Hassell was signed to the New England Patriots practice squad. He was released on December 8.

New York Jets
On December 11, 2020, Hassell was signed to the New York Jets' active roster. Against the Los Angeles Rams on December 20, 2020, he blocked a punt in the second quarter of the game. On August 31, 2021, Hassell was waived by the Jets.

Winnipeg Blue Bombers 
Hasell signed with the Winnipeg Blue Bombers in the Canadian Football League (CFL) on September 6, 2022. He was released by the team on October 12, 2022. Hasell played in four games, recording two special teams tackles.

Toronto Argonauts
On January 4, 2023, it was announced that Hassell had been signed by the Toronto Argonauts.

References

External links
Toronto Argonauts bio
South Dakota State Jackrabbits bio
Florida Tech bio

1995 births
Living people
Astronaut High School alumni
Cleveland Browns players
Florida Tech Panthers football players
New England Patriots players
New York Jets players
People from Titusville, Florida
Players of American football from Florida
South Dakota State Jackrabbits football players
Titusville High School alumni
Toronto Argonauts players